Rhabdochonidae is a family of nematodes belonging to the order Rhabditida.

Genera
Genera:
 Beaninema Caspeta-Mandujano, Moravec & Salgado-Maldonado, 2001
 Fellicola Petter & Køie, 1993
 Freitasia Barus & Coy Otero, 1968
 Hepatinema Rasheed, 1964
 Heptochona Rasheed, 1965
 Johnstonmawsonia Campana-Rouget, 1955
 Johnstonmawsonoides Machida, 1975
 Megachona Mejía-Madrid & Pérez-Ponce de León, 2007
 Pancreatonema McVicar & Gibson, 1975
 Rhabdochoinoides Rahemo & Kasim, 1979
 Rhabdochona Railliet, 1916
 Skrjabinitectus Majumdar & Banerjee, 1966
 Trichospirura Smith & Chitwood, 1967
 Vasorhabdochona Martin & Zam, 1967

References

Nematodes